Job Bartram (March 20, 1735 – October 28, 1817) was a member of the Connecticut House of Representatives from Norwalk in the sessions of May and October 1790. He served as a captain of the Connecticut Militia in the American Revolutionary War.

Family and early life 
Bartram was born in Fairfield, Connecticut Colony on March 20, 1735. He married Jerusha Thompson on November 18, 1762. She died on November 23, 1773. Bartram next married Abigail Starr on November 7, 1774. They had one son Daniel Starr Bartram, born 1775. He next married Elizabeth Scudder on August 27, 1776.

Revolutionary War service 
Bartram was in command of a company in Connecticut's Fifth Regiment under Colonel Samuel Whiting in 1777. He was wounded in Fairfield, in 1779.

Death 
Job Bartram was drowned along with Stephen Morehouse off Black Rock Harbor, Bridgeport.

Tomb inscription: "In memory of Mr. Job Bartram who was drowned October 28, 1817 aged 50 years & 6 months. Also of Jane daughter of Mr. Job & Mrs. Ruth Bartram died Oct 29. 1815, aged 16 months.
Death like an overflowing stream, 
Sweeps us away: our life's a dream: 
An empty tale, a morning flower. 
Cut down and wither'd in an hour."

References 

1735 births
1817 deaths
Connecticut militiamen in the American Revolution
Deaths by drowning in the United States
Members of the Connecticut House of Representatives
People from Fairfield, Connecticut
Politicians from Norwalk, Connecticut
Accidental deaths in Connecticut
Military personnel from Connecticut